San Francisco was an impressionistic documentary film directed by Anthony Stern. The film, cut to a version of "Interstellar Overdrive" as performed by  Pink Floyd in 1966, pioneered the use of 16 mm single frame cinematography in the late 1960s and went on to win awards for cinematography at the Oberhausen, Melbourne and Sydney Film Festival.

The film was produced by the BFI (British Film Institute) and by Iris Sawyer, Jeremy Mitchell, and Alan Callan.

Soundtrack
 Interstellar Overdrive (San Francisco Version) - 15:45

References

External links
 
 

1968 films
British documentary films
Documentary films about San Francisco
1968 documentary films
1960s British films